Ya Kid K (born Manuela Barbara Kamosi Moaso Djogi, 26 January 1972) is a Congolese–Belgian hip hop recording artist. She was the rapper for the dance/house act Technotronic. Her sister is Karoline 'Leki' Kamosi.

Early life
At the age of 11, Djogi moved to Belgium, later moving to Chicago (where she explored hip-hop, and the emerging sounds of house music), and later moved to Dallas, Texas.

Music career
After moving back to Belgium from the US, Ya Kid K helped form a hip hop label called Fresh Beat Productions. She was part of the dance project Technotronic, which debuted with a major worldwide hit in 1989, "Pump Up the Jam". Although she did not appear in the video, she was finally credited as vocalist on the track on the US reissue of the group's debut album.

Although Ya Kid K wrote the lyrics and sang vocals on "Pump Up the Jam", Technotronic had the fashion model Felly Kilingi perform in the video, without Ya Kid K's consent. The second single "Get Up! (Before the Night Is Over)" was Ya Kid K's debut music video with Technotronic. In 1992, Technotronic and Ya Kid K had a hit with "Move This," another single from 1989's Pump Up the Jam: The Album.

She also lent her voice to Hi Tek 3, a dance project whose only single, "Spin that Wheel", appeared on the Teenage Mutant Ninja Turtles motion picture soundtrack.

While Jo Bogaert hired new singers for Technotronic's third album, Body to Body, Ya Kid K returned after limited success of her own album, One World Nation. This album contained many different musical and, in particular, vocal styles.

In 1991, Ya Kid K appeared on the Teenage Mutant Ninja Turtles II: The Secret of the Ooze: The Original Motion Picture Soundtrack, performing "Awesome (You Are My Hero)", continuing her work with the music of the film franchise.  The partnership continued in 1993, when 2 versions of Ya Kid K's "Rockin' over the Beat" appeared on the Teenage Mutant Ninja Turtles III: Original Motion Picture Soundtrack.

In 1995, Technotronic re-emerged in the U.S. with Ya Kid K as its front vocalist, again with limited success of the album, Recall. On the track "Are You Ready" she teamed up with Daisy Dee, who already did a cover version of "This Beat is…" with MC B. In 1996, a Ya Kid K single titled "Rock My World" was released. She appeared in June 2000 on Technotronic's single "The Mariachi." In 2002, she released Take a Trip on Semini Records.

In 1997, Ya Kid K also provided fresh vocals for the 2 Skinnee J's cover of "Pump Up the Jam" entitled, "BBQ". She sang "Pump up the gas grill" as the chorus.

In October 2005, Ya Kid K made a guest appearance on Public Warning the debut album of English female rapper Lady Sovereign.

In 2011, she returned with the song "DO UC ME Standing". Ya Kid K also released the song "Comes Love" on Baronic Arts.

In 2014 she released some new tracks and an album called Stalled Constructions. She also worked with the German dance project Maviic for the single release "Moja Mbili Tatu".

Personal life
After the single "Rockin' Over the Beat", Ya Kid K had a child with MC Eric who performed the Technotronic hit "This Beat Is Technotronic".

Discography
 1992: One World Nation (The Kids Shall Overcome) SBK/EMI
 2014: Stalled Constructions (digital download)

References

External links
 Ya Kid K Discogs.com
 Ya Kid K channel YouTube

1972 births
Living people
People from Kinshasa
Belgian women rappers
Belgian women singers
Belgian new beat musicians
Hip house musicians
Naturalised citizens of Belgium
Belgian expatriates in the United States
Democratic Republic of the Congo emigrants to Belgium
Democratic Republic of the Congo expatriates in the United States
English-language singers from Belgium
SBK Records artists
Belgian people of Democratic Republic of the Congo descent
Women in electronic music